OVD may refer to:

OVD, IATA airport code for Asturias Airport, Asturias, Spain
ovd, ISO 639-3 code for Elfdalian, a North Germanic language spoken in Sweden
Online video distributor, also known as over-the-top media services 
Optical Variable Device, an iridescent image that exhibits various optical effects such as movement or color changes
Ophthalmic Viscosurgical Device, a viscoelastic solution used in eye surgery
Oracle Virtual Directory, a component of Oracle Fusion Middleware
Old Vatted Demerara, a brand of rum distilled by William Grant & Sons